John Boag (14 February 1965 – 2006) was a footballer and captain of Greenock Morton. He also spent a short time with the Royal Mail .

Playing career
Boag joined Morton from Aberdeen in 1984 and played for the club for nine years, until 1993. He played for Dumbarton in 1993 prior to retirement.

Death
Boag was found dead in his flat in Port Glasgow in July 2006.

References

External links
 

1965 births
2006 deaths
Scottish footballers
Greenock Morton F.C. players
People from Port Glasgow
Aberdeen F.C. players
Dumbarton F.C. players
Association football defenders
Scottish Football League players
Footballers from Inverclyde